Alan Bolton may refer to:

 Alan Bolton (darts player), New Zealand darts player
 Alan Bolton (cricketer) (1939–2003), English cricketer